Vishmadev Chattopadhyay (8 November 1909 – 8 August 1977) was an eminent vocal artist in Indian Classical Music, a revered Guru (আচার্য্য or Ustad) in the Delhi Gharana of the vocal classical genre, and a music director in Bengali Film Industry in its early era.

Early life
Vishmadev was born on 8 November 1909 at Sarai village near Pandua station of Hooghly district in West Bengal of Ashutosh Chattopadhyay and Prabhabati Devi. His family was known to have spiritual inclinations, being descendants of Sadhak Gangananda Swami, and had relations with the family of Shri Ramakrishna (born Gadadhar Chattopadhyay).

Education and music

Vishmadev was known to have shown proficiency in music since his childhood, and considered as child prodigy. He studied at Sanskrit Collegiate School in Calcutta. Then he joined Calcutta Training Academy where from he passed his entrance examination. After passing he joined Vidyasagar College.

First lesson
First lessons in Classical music was imparted to him by Shri Nagendranath Datta. He received training (তালিম) from Khalifa Badal Khan of Delhi gharana for fourteen years, and also collected some bandish from Ustad Faiyaz Khan from Arga gharana. His first album was released from HMV with two songs depicting Toppa of Nidhubabu (নিধুবাবুর টপ্পা) during May, 1926. The two songs of his first record were "সখী কি করে লোকের কথায়" in Raga Khamaj and "এত কি চাতুরী সহে প্রাণে" (Record No. P7402). His last recording released from Megaphone Company in July 1968 too contained the same song "সখী কি করে লোকের কথায়" (Record No JNG 6237). He earned fame and reverence for his contribution in Khayal in Hindusthani Classical Music. In 1933 he was appointed as a Music director cum trainer in the Megaphone Record Company.

Professional engagement
In 1933 at the insistence of Nazrul Islam Vishmadev joined Megaphone Company as the Music Director and Instructor. He regularly published records on Khayal. Sometime during 1936 Mr. J.N. Ghosh, the owner of Megaphone Company, along with poet Ajay Bhattacharya requested him to sing Bengali songs. On the day of recording Vismadev instantly composed music for the poem written by Ajay Bhattacharya and completed recording. the songs were: ‘ফুলের দিন হল যে অবসান’ and ‘শেষের গানটি ছিল তোমার লাগি’.

In 1937 Vishmadev joined Film Corporation as Music Director. He directed music for six Bengali movies and six Hindi movies . Sachin Dev Burman was his assistant in four theses movies. The first movie of this series, "Rikta" (1939), directed by Sushil Majumdar, was a milestone film as it made a great stir in the music world by mingling the tune of east and west for the first time in any Indian film .

The rabindra Sangeet legend Chinmoy Chattopadhyay received training on classical music from him at a stretch for twelve long years.

Discography 
Contribution as a Vocal artist

Contribution as a Music Director

Memoirs 
Vishmadev is remembered as a maestro and an exponent in rendition of Khayal and Thumri, and extremely revered in his field. Observations from a few eminent personalities are compiled as under:

Akhil Bandhu Ghosh: Nobody like him will ever be born in Bengal. No one will be able to sing Thumri as he used to. He was the creator of Bengalee Raagpradhan Song. Listening to his music made me singing.
Dhananjay Bhattacharya (Renowned Singer of Bengal): To comment on him means to worship mother Ganges with her own water, ... I would rather undertake the impossible task of showing the Sun by lighting a match stick but somehow or other to bring him to light by me is a total no-no affair.
Hirendra Kumar Gangopadhyay (Hiru Ganguly): He is an exemplary figure. I had many chances to accompany him but every time I felt that he was different, extraordinary. He had a wonderful command on laya. The skill he had on harmonium playing is also a rare illustration.
Mushtaq Ali Khan (Sitar Maestro): I have never seen such a musical brain like Vishmadev. He had a great command over melody. He could create such an atmosphere by juxtaposing the 'Komal' and 'Tibra' notes in Thumri songs that though it was against Shastrik rules the application could transform the musicians as also the musicologist to such an ecstatic state that they did not better to feel that it was crossing the periphery of set rules, rather this made them exclaim - 'Oh God! What to say! None but Bhishmadev can only do this!'
Pankaj Kumar Mallick (Renowned Singer & Composer of Bengal): In spite of being older Sachin (S. D. Burman) accepted him as his Guru. Vishmadev was literally Sangeet Guru in the matter of Shastriya sangeet and the excellence of his voice. Nowhere did I find his comparison.
Premendra Mitra: Vishmadev was an artist of modern temperament. He composed a unique tune by mingling the western tune with the Indian one. That was the first time when western music was put into Indian film. The song was set for a Bengalee film named Rikta.
Pt. Siaram Tewari: It is since many years that such a genius singer appeared like sunrays in the musical horizon. He used to enchant everybody within a few moments by his song. Intoxication of Bandish, melody of the tune and TAASIR of the voice are all present in his khyal song. I observed that while singing he used to become so much absorbed in the music, and it appeared as if he was singing for the listening to the God himself.
Radhika Mohan Moitra (Sarode Maestro): Vishmadev belongs to the epoch-making artist of this class who has easily entered into the depth of delightful world through peaceful and meditative trance where the rules of Sastra are inactive or different techniques of music have been ceased to exist. In his divine music lyric, laya, tune, rhythm have forsaken their individual existence in the midst of unearthly romantic union.
Rajyeswar Mitra (Sharangdeb): The consummate artistry exhibited by him in the matter of application of ‘swaras’ was beyond the wildest imagination of the best among artists. He had indeed become an idea personified, a legend in his lifetime and remains so to this day.
Ramkumar Chattopadhyay (Renowned Singer & Composer of Bengal): In my music life Kaloda (pet name of Sangeetacharya Bhishmadev Chattopadhyay) was my idol. ... I have seen kaloda as a saint, as a learner, as a perfect artist – and a total oblivious ... indifferent one. I cannot remember seeing anyone else so much engrossed with tune, taan, rhythm like him. I owe to him so much in my music life that this debt is unrepayable. Kaloda was gifted with the blessings of Goddess Saraswati.
Ratanjanker S.N.: He is a person of very sober, gentle and absolute artistic mood. The style of his singing is very attractive. His songs always come to my memory with special joy and liking. His songs will remain ever fresh to the music lovers.
V. Balsara (Music Director and Composer): I was not fortunate enough to listen to the songs of Vishmadev for many a time. But what I heard was enough to make me inspire as well as perspire as he used to play with the tune in such a way that was beyond one's imagination and belief.

Legacy
Acharya Vishmadev is remembered not only for the outstanding rendition of his songs such as Khyal, Thumri and Bhajans, but also for his patronage towards research and training initiatives in Hindusthani Classical Music. He was creator of Bengali Ragpradhan gaan. His famous disciples include Kumar Shyamanand Singh, Sachin Mukherjee, Sachin Dev Barman, Bivash Dev Barman, Suresh Chakraborty, Uma Basu, Kananbala Devi, Pahari Sanyal, Prakash Kali Ghoshal, Bhabani Das, Pratima Bandopadhyay, Himangshu Roy, Saila Devi, Juthika Roy, Begam Aakhtar, Sabita Dey, Akhtari Bai, Chhaya Devi, Chinmoy Chattopadhyay and Jayanta Chattopadhyay (son), to name a few.
He is the only Bengali classical vocalist who got invitation to perform from all over the then undivided India. He had founded new style of harmonium playing , one record of his harmonium playing is preserved in London Museum .
UNESCO collected two records of his four songs to give an idea of Indian Music.
A street in New Alipur, Kolkata, is named after him—Pd Vishmadev Chattopadhay Sarani.
An NGO named "Vishmadev Memorial Trust" had been formed having registration no. 12661/09, in 30, Sarkar Lane, Kolkata 700007, under the chairmanship of Sri Jayanta Chattopadhyay, son of the revered maestro, to cultivate, protect and propagate the systematic methodical and scientific training of traditional music and the gayaki of Vishmadev gharana for the future generation.
Vishmadev Memorial Trust produced two documentary films on his life, directed by Sri Jayanta Chattopadhay -- "Sangeet Ratnakar Vishmadev" in 2008 and "Vishmadev-Ek Kimbadanti" in 2009.Even Kazi najrul Islam was an admirer of Vishmadev . On his request he joined Megaphone Company in 1933 as music director cum trainer.

Awards and recognition
1972: Honorary D.Lit by Rabindra Bharati University.
1975: Documentary film on the life of Acharya Vishmadev Chattopadhyay by Government of West Bengal.
1976: Sangeet Nayak Puraskar by Prachin Kala Kendra Chandigarh. 
1979: Documentary film on the life of Acharya Vishmadev Chattopadhyay by Kolkata Doordarshan.
1991: Documentary film on the life of Acharya Vishmadev Chattopadhyay by Kolkata Doordarshan.
2006: Posthumous Swami Santadas Smarak Samman by Swami Santadas Institute of Culture.
2006: Documentary film on the life of Acharya Vishmadev Chattopadhyay by Kolkata Doordarshan.

References 

Bengal Renaissance
Bengali musicians
Hindustani singers
20th-century Indian male classical singers
Indian classical composers
1909 births
1977 deaths
Indian classical musicians of Bengal
Singers from West Bengal